The 1998-99 Allied Dunbar Premiership Two was the twelfth full season of rugby union within the second tier of the English league system, currently known as the RFU Championship.  The league was expanded from twelve teams to fourteen and new teams to the division included Bristol who had been relegated from the Allied Dunbar Premiership 1997-98 while London Welsh, Rugby Lions, Leeds Tykes and Worcester were promoted from National League 1. Allied Dunbar sponsored the top two divisions of the English rugby union leagues for the second season in a row. The leagues were previously known as the Courage Clubs Championship and sponsored by Courage Brewery.

Bristol, the champions, were promoted to the Allied Dunbar Premiership for season 1999–00. The runners–up Rotherham lost to the thirteenth placed team in the Premership (Bedford) in a two legged play–off and did not gain promotion. Blackheath and Fylde were relegated to Jewson National League 1 for the following season.

Participating teams

Table
  

Allied Dunbar Premiership Two 1998-99

Results

Round 1

Round 2

Round 3 

Postponed.  Game rescheduled for 20 February 1999.

Round 4

Round 5

Round 6

Round 7

Round 8

Round 9

Round 10

Round 11

Round 12

Round 13

Round 14

Round 15 

Postponed.  Game rescheduled for 20 March 1999.

Round 16 

Postponed.  Game rescheduled for 21 February 1999.

Round 17

Round 18

Round 3 & 16 (Rescheduled games)

Round 19

Round 20

Round 15 (Rescheduled game)

Round 21

Round 22

Round 26 (Rescheduled game) 

Game brought forward from 8 May 1999.

Round 23

Round 24

Round 25

Round 26 

Game brought forward to 10 April 1999.

Total Season Attendances

Individual statistics 

 Note that points scorers includes tries as well as conversions, penalties and drop goals.

Top points scorers

Top try scorers

Season records

Team
Largest home win — 57 pts
60 - 3 Orrell at home to Blackheath on 26 September 1998
Largest away win — 48 pts
51 - 3 Worcester away to Blackheath on 16 January 1999
Most points scored — 77 pts
71 - 22 London Welsh at home to Blackheath on 17 April 1999
Most tries in a match — 11 (x2)
London Welsh at home to Blackheath on 17 April 1999
Worcester at home to Wakefield on 17 April 1999
Most conversions in a match — 8 (x2)
Coventry at home to Fylde on 26 September 1998
London Welsh at home to Blackheath on 17 April 1999
Most penalties in a match — 7
Leeds Tykes away to Coventry on 2 January 1999
Most drop goals in a match — 1
N/A - multiple teams

Player
Most points in a match — 34
 Steve Gough for Coventry at home to London Welsh on 10 October 1998
Most tries in a match — 5
 Luke Nabaro for Bristol at home to Blackheath on 13 March 1999
Most conversions in a match — 8 (x2)
 Steve Gough for Coventry at home to Fylde on 26 September 1998
 Craig Raymond for London Welsh at home to Blackheath on 17 April 1999
Most penalties in a match —  7
 Sateki Tuipulotu for Leeds Tykes away to Coventry on 2 January 1999
Most drop goals in a match —  1
N/A - multiple players

Attendances

Highest — 7,326 
Bristol at home to Worcester on 9 May 1999
Lowest — 287
Leeds Tykes at home to Moseley on 16 April 1999
Highest Average Attendance — 3,336
Bristol
Lowest Average Attendance — 583
Wakefield

See also
 English rugby union system

References

External links
Wakefield Rugby Table History

1998–99 in English rugby union leagues
1998-99